"Rearrange" is a song by the English musician Miles Kane from his debut studio album Colour of the Trap. It was released on 25 March 2011 as a Digital download in the United Kingdom. It has peaked to number 149 on the UK Singles Chart. A remix by popular dubstep producer Skream was also included on the single's digital release.

Music video
A music video to accompany the release of "Rearrange" was first released onto YouTube on 31 March 2011.

Track listing

Chart performance

Release history

References 

2011 singles
2011 songs
Sony Music singles
Songs written by Alex Turner (musician)
Songs written by Miles Kane